Gallardon may refer to:
 Alberto Ruiz-Gallardón
 Estadio Eduardo Gallardón
 Gallardon, France